Wilhelm Siegenthaler was a Swiss rower active in the 1920s who rowed for RC Reuss Luzern. He won five European titles.

Siegenthaler had his first success at the European level at the 1924 European Rowing Championships in Zürich where he won gold in the coxless pair with Alois Reinhard. At the 1925 European Rowing Championships in Prague, he won gold in both with coxless and the coxed pair, with Reinhard as the fellow rower and Walter Ludin as cox. He gained two further gold medals at the 1926 European Rowing Championships at his base at Lake Lucerne with the coxless pair and the coxless four. At the 1927 European Rowing Championships in Como, he won silver medals with the coxless pair and the men's eight.

References

Year of birth missing
Year of death missing
Sportspeople from Lucerne
Swiss male rowers
European Rowing Championships medalists